Sir Henry Philip Hoghton, 7th Baronet  (1768–1835) was a British politician who sat in the House of Commons from 1795 to 1802.

Hoghton was the elder son of Sir Henry Hoghton, 6th Baronet and his second wife Fanny Booth, daughter of Daniel Booth of Hutton Hall, Essex, Governor of the Bank of England, and was born on 12 June 1768. He was educated at Charterhouse School from 1784 to 1785 and was admitted at St. John’s College, Cambridge in 1786. He was High Sheriff of Lancashire in 1794-5 and succeeded his father in the baronetcy  on 9 March 1795. He married Susannah Parker, widow of Thomas Townley Parker of Cuerden Hall and daughter of Peter Brooke of Astley Hall on 13 November 1797.
 
Hoghton replaced his father as Member of Parliament for Preston
at an uncontested by-election on 26 March 1795. The Earl of Derby  sponsored his election to Brooks on 14 November 1795. He was returned as MP for Preston  in the 1796 general election after a contest. He did not speak in parliament and gave up his seat at the 1802 general election.

Hoghton was Colonel of the 3rd Royal Lancashire Militia from 1797 to 1803. He died on 27 November 1835.

References

Obituary The Gentleman's Magazine, Volumes 159-160 p 312.

1768 births
1835 deaths
Baronets in the Baronetage of England
British MPs 1790–1796
British MPs 1796–1800
Members of the Parliament of Great Britain for English constituencies
Members of the Parliament of the United Kingdom for English constituencies
UK MPs 1801–1802
People educated at Charterhouse School
Alumni of St John's College, Cambridge
Lancashire Militia officers
High Sheriffs of Lancashire